Carrows is a subsidiary of Shari's Cafe & Pies and casual dining restaurant that serve breakfast and lunch/dinner in California, United States. As of March 2023, the company operates 1 location in California.

Carrows was started by David G. Nancarrow in Santa Clara, California in 1970 as the Carrows Hickory Chip Restaurant. Carrows and its sister chain Coco's Bakery Restaurants were purchased by Advantica Restaurant Group in 1996, which would file for bankruptcy the following year. In 2002 they were acquired by Catalina Restaurant Group, Inc.

In California, Carrows/Coco's Bakery competes directly with Marie Callender's and Bakers Square restaurants.

In 2006, Catalina Restaurant Group was bought by Japanese company Zensho Co., Ltd., which has operated Coco's Japan for many years.

In 2015, Food Management Partners acquired Catalina Restaurant Group Inc., (parent of Coco's and Carrows).

In September 2018, it was announced that Shari's Cafe & Pies had taken over Carrows and Coco's.

References

External links
Company website

Economy of the Southwestern United States
Regional restaurant chains in the United States
Fast-food chains of the United States
Restaurants established in 1970
1970 establishments in California
Companies based in Santa Clara, California
Companies that filed for Chapter 11 bankruptcy in 1997
Companies that filed for Chapter 11 bankruptcy in 2001